The Thor DSV-2 was a series of sounding rockets, test vehicles, and anti-satellite weapons derived from the Thor Intermediate-range ballistic missile. It was also used as the first stage of several Thor-derived expendable launch systems.

Variants
Thor DSV-2C

Thor DSV-2D
The DSV-2D was launched twice in 1962, conducting suborbital research flights for the development of the Program 437 ASAT. It was a single-stage vehicle, consisting of a Thor DM-21. Launches were conducted from Cape Canaveral Air Force Station Launch Complex 17A.

Thor DSV-2E
The DSV-2E was a single-stage vehicle, using a Thor DM-19. It was launched eight times in 1962, including several nuclear weapons tests as part of Operation Fishbowl. Three launches failed, all of which were carrying live nuclear warheads. Launches were conducted from Launch Emplacements 1 and 2 on Johnston Atoll.

Thor DSV-2F

The DSV-2F was a single-stage vehicle consisting of a Thor DM-19, like the DSV-2E. Three were launched between 1963 and 1964, as part of Project ASSET, which involved launching a sub-scale mockup of the X-20 Dyna-Soar to test materials for the larger spacecraft. Launches were conducted from Cape Canaveral Air Force Station Launch Complex 17B.

Thor DSV-2G
The DSV-2G was a two-stage rocket, consisting of a Thor DM-19 first stage, and a Delta second stage. Three were launched between 1965 and 1965 as part of Project ASSET. Launches were conducted from Cape Canaveral Air Force Station Launch Complex 17B.

Thor DSV-2J
The DSV-2J was an operational nuclear anti-satellite weapon. 18 were launched between 1964 and 1975. Most flights were non-intercept tests of the rocket's anti-satellite capabilities, however some later launches carried research payloads. Launches were conducted from Launch Emplacements 1 and 2 on Johnston Atoll.

References

Expendable space launch systems
Thor (rocket family)